Sugarcane is the primary cash crop among farmers of the western Maharashtra region. The sugarcane is mostly sold to sugar mills for sugar production. Majority of these mills are cooperatives owned by the sugarcane growers. Solapur district has highest number of sugar factories in Maharashtra.

History

The cooperative movement for the sugar industry started in the 1960s in Maharashtra with the announcement of 12 places in the state where sugar factories could be established. The then Bombay state government announced a capital share of one million rupees to establish sugar factories at these potential 12 places. A central committee was formed by Bombay State Cooperative Bank under the chairmanship of economist Dhananjayrao Gadgil.
Asia's first cooperative sugar factory was established at Pravaranagar in the Ahmednagar District of the then Bombay state in 1950  by Vithalrao Vikhe Patil, & Gadgil. The sugar mill, called Pravara Sahakari Sakhar Karkhana Ltd, had majority ownership by the local farmers.

Sugar cooperatives and State politics
Over the last sixty years, the local sugar mills have played a crucial part in encouraging rural political participation and as a stepping stone for aspiring politicians. In Maharashtra there are a large number of politicians belonging to the Congress or NCP with ties to sugar cooperatives from their respective local areas.  Unfortunately, mismanagement and manipulation of the cooperative principles has made a number of these operations inefficient.

Present scenario
In 2016,  there were 173 cooperative sugar factories in operation. Maharashtra accounts for 20% of sugar production in India  behind Uttar Pradesh at 24%. The presence of this industry has led to development of rural places, from which the sugarcane is drawn to factories, including an improved road network, transportation facilities, medical facilities, education facilities, and banking.
Sugar mills in Maharashtra produced just over 100,000 tons of sugar in 2017-18 season, however the glut in global sugar production and the subsequent price crash has led to sugar factories not being able to pay the farmers to the tune of 20 billion rupees (US $300 million).

See also
 Cooperative movement in India

References

Agriculture in Maharashtra
Cooperatives in Maharashtra
Indian sugar industry
Sugar refineries
Agricultural cooperatives in India
1960s establishments in Maharashtra